The 1902 Minnesota Senate election was held in the U.S. state of Minnesota on November 4, 1902, to elect members to the Senate of the 33rd and 34th Minnesota Legislatures.

Two years after Democrat John Lind lost the governorship to Republican Samuel Rinnah Van Sant, the Minnesota Democratic Party was set to lose seats in the Senate. Without Lind, the Party lost the third party support that they had consolidated in 1898. The People's Party ran candidates against a handful of Democratic candidates in rural areas, hurting Democratic prospects.

The Minnesota Republican Party won a large majority of seats, followed by the Minnesota Democratic Party. The new Legislature convened on January 6, 1903.

16 Republicans and 3 Democrats ran uncontested.

Results

See also 

 Minnesota gubernatorial election, 1902

References 

1902 Minnesota elections
Minnesota
Minnesota Senate elections